The International Association of Heat and Frost Insulators and Allied Workers (AWIU or Insulators) is a trade union in the United States and Canada, founded in 1903. It is affiliated with the AFL–CIO and the Canadian Labour Congress and the North America's Building Trades Unions.

The union was formerly known as the International Association of Heat and Frost Insulators and Asbestos Workers, but the name was changed to reflect a symbolic new direction away from the hazards of exposure to asbestos.

References

Further reading
 Fink, Gary M. ed. Labor unions (Greenwood, 1977) pp. 21–23.  online

External links
 Official website

AFL–CIO
Canadian Labour Congress
Building and construction trade unions